Francisco José Irarrázaval (born 5 October 1971 in Mendoza) is a former Argentine rugby union player. He played as a flanker.

He played for Club Newman, finishing his career in 2007/08.

He had 3 caps for Argentina, from 1991 to 1992, without ever scoring. He had his debut at the 35-12 loss to Samoa, in Pontypridd, at 13 October 1991, for the 1991 Rugby World Cup. It would be his only presence at the competition. He had his last game for the "Pumas" at the 43-34 win over Spain, in Madrid, at 24 October 1992, in a tour.

References

External links
Francisco Irarrázaval International Statistics

1971 births
Living people
Argentine rugby union players
Argentina international rugby union players
Club Newman rugby union players
Rugby union flankers
Sportspeople from Mendoza, Argentina